The Royal Canadian Navy (RCN; , MRC) is the naval force of Canada. The RCN is one of three environmental commands within the Canadian Armed Forces. As of 2021, the RCN operates 12 frigates, four attack submarines, 12 coastal defence vessels, eight patrol class training vessels, two offshore patrol vessels, and several auxiliary vessels. The RCN consists of 8,570 Regular Force and 4,111 Primary Reserve sailors, supported by 3,800 civilians. Vice-Admiral Angus Topshee is the current commander of the Royal Canadian Navy and chief of the Naval Staff.

Founded in 1910 as the Naval Service of Canada (French: Service naval du Canada) and given royal sanction on 29 August 1911, the RCN was amalgamated with the Royal Canadian Air Force and the Canadian Army to form the unified Canadian Armed Forces in 1968, after which it was known as Maritime Command (French: Commandement maritime) until 2011.

In 2011, its historical title of "Royal Canadian Navy" was restored. Throughout its history, the RCN has served in the First and Second World Wars, the Korean War, the Persian Gulf War, Afghanistan, and numerous United Nations peacekeeping missions and NATO operations.

History

1910–1968
Established following the introduction of the Naval Service Act by Prime Minister Sir Wilfrid Laurier, the Naval Service of Canada (NSC) was intended as a distinct naval force for Canada, that, should the need arise, could be placed under British control. The bill received royal assent on 4 May 1910. Initially equipped with two former Royal Navy vessels, HMCS Niobe and HMCS Rainbow, King George V granted permission for the service to be known as the Royal Canadian Navy on 29 August 1911.

During the first years of the First World War, the RCN's six-vessel naval force patrolled both the North American west and east coasts to deter the German naval threat, with a seventh ship, HMCS Shearwater, joining the force in 1915. Just before the end of the war in 1918, the Royal Canadian Naval Air Service was established with the purpose of carrying out anti-submarine operations; however, it was disbanded after the armistice of 11 November.

After the war, the RCN took over certain responsibilities of the Department of Transport's Marine Service and slowly started to build its fleet, with the first warships specifically designed for the RCN being commissioned in 1932. At the outbreak of the Second World War, the Navy had 11 combat vessels, 145 officers and 1,674 men. During the Second World War, the RCN expanded significantly, ultimately gaining responsibility for the entire Northwest Atlantic theatre of war. During the Battle of the Atlantic, the RCN sank 31 U-boats and sank or captured 42 enemy surface vessels, while successfully completing 25,343 merchant crossings. The navy lost 33 ships and 1,797 sailors in the war.

Starting in May 1944, when Canada began drafting plans to assume a larger role in the Pacific Theatre after achieving victory in Europe, the Canadian government recognized that the RCN would require vessels that were much larger than what it currently had. Canadian naval staff advocated for HMS Nabob and HMS Puncher to be given back to the Royal Navy in exchange for two light fleet carriers. The Canadian government agreed to acquire two carriers on loan from the Royal Navy, with an option to purchase them, but they were not ready before the war ended. Postwar budget cuts meant that Canada could only afford to operate one aircraft carrier, instead of two as originally planned. The RCN operated HMCS Warrior from 1946 to 1948, before exchanging it with the Royal Navy for the slightly larger HMCS Magnificent.

From 1950 to 1955, during and after the Korean War, Canadian destroyers maintained a presence off of the Korean peninsula, engaging in shore bombardments and maritime interdiction. During the Cold War, the Navy developed an anti-submarine capability to counter the growing Soviet naval threat. In November 1956, HMCS Magnificent was chosen to transport men and supplies to Egypt as part of Canada's response to the Suez Crisis. In preparation for use as a transport, the ship's weapons were stripped, and her complement was reduced to 600 personnel. The initial plan was to embark the Queen's Own Rifles of Canada, but that order was rescinded in December. Magnificent waited in Halifax until the end of the month, then sailed for Egypt carrying 406 Canadian troops and their vehicles, four Royal Canadian Air Force de Havilland Canada DHC-3 Otters, and a single H04S helicopter. She returned to Canada in March 1957. Later in 1957, the RCN paid off HMCS Magnificent and commissioned , which was better suited for jet aircraft. She flew the McDonnell F2H Banshee fighter jet until 1962, as well as various other anti-submarine aircraft until her decommissioning. In the 1960s, the RCN retired most of its Second World War vessels, and further developed its anti-submarine warfare capabilities by acquiring the Sikorsky CH-124 Sea King, and successfully pioneered the use of large maritime helicopters on small surface vessels.

1968–present

From 1964 through 1968, under Prime Minister Lester B. Pearson, the Royal Canadian Navy, Royal Canadian Air Force and Canadian Army were amalgamated to form the unified Canadian Forces. This process was overseen by then–defence minister Paul Hellyer. The controversial merger resulted in the abolition of the RCN as a separate legal entity. All personnel, ships, and aircraft became part of Maritime Command (MARCOM), an element of the Canadian Armed Forces. The traditional naval uniform was eliminated and all naval personnel were required to wear the new Canadian Armed Forces rifle green uniform, adopted also by former Royal Canadian Air Force and Canadian Army personnel. Ship-borne aircraft continued to be under the command of MARCOM, while shore-based patrol aircraft of the former Royal Canadian Air Force were transferred to MARCOM. In 1975 Air Command was formed and all maritime aircraft were transferred to Air Command's Maritime Air Group. The unification of the Canadian Forces in 1968 was the first time that a nation with a modern military combined its formerly separate naval, land and air elements into a single service.

HMCS Bonaventure was sold off in 1970, shortly after completing a 16-month, $11 million mid-life refit. The 1970s saw the addition of four s, which were later updated to air defence destroyers, and in the late 1980s and 1990s the construction of twelve s and the purchase of the s. In 1990, Canada deployed three warships to support Operation Friction. Later in the decade, ships were deployed to patrol the Adriatic Sea during the Yugoslav Wars and the Kosovo War. More recently, Maritime Command provided vessels to serve as a part of Operation Apollo and to combat piracy off the coast of Somalia.

Following the Official Languages Act enshrinement in 1969, MARCOM instituted the French Language Unit, which constituted a francophone unit with the navy. In the 1980s and 1990s, women were also accepted into the fleet, with the submarine service the last to allow them, beginning in 2001.

Some of the changes that had taken place during the unification of the forces began to be undone. In 1985, MARCOM received new black uniforms, differentiating them from the land-based forces. By 1990, the three senior naval officers of MARCOM had recreated the Naval Board. On 16 August 2011, the government restored the historic names of the Canadian Forces' three environmental services: Maritime Command became the "Royal Canadian Navy", Air Command the "Royal Canadian Air Force," and Land Force Command the "Canadian Army."

As of August 2015, with the loss of area air defence and (temporarily) resupply capabilities, the RCN was then classified as a Rank 5 navy (offshore regional coastal defence) on the Todd-Lindberg navy classification system of naval strength, dropping from Rank 3 (multiregional power projection) in 2005.

Structure
The RCN is headquartered at National Defence Headquarters (NDHQ) in Ottawa, Ontario. Since 1968, the RCN has been an environmental command of the Canadian Armed Forces and since 2012 it has been charged with maintaining and generating forces for the Canadian Joint Operations Command.

Maritime Forces Atlantic

The RCN's Atlantic Fleet, known as Canadian Fleet Atlantic is co-located with Maritime Forces Atlantic (MARLANT), with headquarters at CFB Halifax in Halifax, Nova Scotia. It is supported by CFS St. John's in Newfoundland. Attached to MARLANT and CFB Halifax is the Royal Canadian Air Force's 12 Wing Shearwater, based at Shearwater Heliport, which provides shipborne air support for the Atlantic Fleet. The RCAF's 14 Wing Greenwood provides fixed-wing air support for MARLANT through 404 Maritime Patrol and Training Squadron and 405 Maritime Patrol Squadron. Other Atlantic Fleet facilities are CFAD Bedford, an ammunition depot, and two radio stations, Naval Radio Section (NRS) Newport Corner and NRS Mill Cove.

The Atlantic Fleet, with 18 warships and a number of auxiliary vessels, is responsible for Canada's exclusive economic zone on the East Coast, as well as Canada's area of responsibility in the Atlantic Ocean and the eastern Arctic Ocean.

Maritime Forces Pacific

The RCN's Pacific Fleet, known as Canadian Fleet Pacific is co-located with Maritime Forces Pacific (MARPAC), with headquarters at CFB Esquimalt in British Columbia, in the Greater Victoria region. MARPAC consists of over 4,000 naval personnel and 2,000 civilian personnel.

Comprising 15 warships and several auxiliary vessels homeported in Esquimalt, the Pacific Fleet is responsible for Canada's exclusive economic zone on the West Coast and Canada's area of responsibility in the Pacific Ocean and the western Arctic Ocean. Fleet Maintenance Facility Cape Breton provides repair and maintenance services to the Pacific Fleet. The Royal Canadian Air Force's 443 Maritime Helicopter Squadron, based at Patricia Bay Heliport but under the control of 12 Wing Shearwater, provides shipborne helicopter support for the Pacific Fleet, while 19 Wing Comox provides fixed-wing maritime air support for MARPAC through 407 Long Range Patrol Squadron. Other Pacific Fleet facilities are CFAD Rocky Point, an ammunition depot, and Naval Radio Section Aldergrove.

Canadian Forces Naval Reserve 

The Canadian Forces Naval Reserve is the Primary Reserve component of the RCN. The primary mission of the NAVRES is to force generate sailors and teams for CAF operations, including: domestic safety operations as well as security and defence missions, while at the same time supporting the Navy's efforts in connecting with Canadians through the maintenance of a broad national presence.

Naval Tactical Operations Group 
The Naval Tactical Operations Group (NTOG) is a unit of between 85–100 personnel (full-time and reserve sailors) dedicated to conducting boarding on non-compliant vessels of interest. Training includes precision shooting, hand-to-hand combat, interrogation techniques, advanced medical skills, the planning of missions and identification of improvised explosive devices.

Naval Security Team 
The Naval Security Team (NST) is a modular, scalable, flexible, and deployable naval team primarily composed of naval reservists, with Regular Force members rounding out the team when required. Tasked with providing enhanced force protection (FP) and security of deployed RCN ships and personnel at home or overseas, the NST deployed for the first time in 2017 providing force protection for  during her port visit to Busan, South Korea. Headquartered at Canadian Forces Base (CFB) Esquimalt the NST reports directly to the Commander Canadian Fleet Pacific.

Fleet

Warships

The RCN operates twelve frigates, four patrol submarines, two Arctic and offshore patrol ships, twelve coastal-defence vessels and eight unarmed patrol/training vessels. In addition to the surface vessels, the RCN operates four Victoria-class submarines that were acquired from the Royal Navy in 1998. These warships carry the designation His Majesty's Canadian submarine. The RCN also maintains and operates , a historic sailing ship launched in 1921 which was commissioned in 1952 as a sail-training ship. Thus, Oriole is the oldest commissioned ship in the RCN.

On 19 September 2014, the RCN announced the decommissioning of its two Protecteur-class resupply ships, along with two Iroquois-class destroyers. The Naval Tactical Operations Group (NTOG), established in 2015, has units based on warships to provide enhanced naval boarding capability.

Auxiliary vessels
The RCN operates auxiliary vessels to support the Canadian Forces. These vessels are not warships and do not carry the HMCS designation.

Aircraft

Since 1975, all aircraft supporting the RCN are operated by the Royal Canadian Air Force through 1 Canadian Air Division. Since 1995, all CH-124 Sea King helicopters have been operated by squadrons under 12 Wing (from Shearwater Heliport and Patricia Bay Heliport). Similarly, all CP-140 Aurora and CP-140A Arcturus anti-submarine, ship surveillance and maritime patrol aircraft have been operated by squadrons under 14 Wing at CFB Greenwood and 19 Wing at CFB Comox. As of February 2019, the Sea King had been retired and there were 17 interim model CH-148 Cyclone helicopters configured for ship-borne anti-submarine warfare, 18 CP-140 Aurora fixed-wing aircraft for land-based anti-submarine warfare and area surveillance (of which 14 are being modernized and retained for active operations), for land-based maritime surveillance. The RCN has some ships assigned with a UAV:
 CU-176 Gargoyle UAV - Harry DeWolf-class AOPV
 AeroVironment RQ-20 Puma - Kingston-class MCDV

Future procurement
During the past several years, the following major projects have been announced by the Government of Canada to modernize the Canadian Navy:
 The  began as the Joint Support Ship Project is a program to replace the previous  replenishment vessels with two to three new joint support ships, providing support to naval task forces, a limited sealift capability and limited theatre command and control. The JSS project dates back to 2002–2003 and plans were advanced enough at the time to begin construction, though with the change in government in 2006 that project was cancelled and replaced with a less capable and smaller planned acquisition. The RCN has decided to move forward with two  replenishment ships under JSS, replacing the two Protecteur-class AORs. As part of the National Shipbuilding Procurement Strategy (NSPS), the ships will be built by Seaspan Marine Corporation at the Vancouver Shipyards facility located in North Vancouver, British Columbia. These Berlin-class ships will displace approximately 22,250 tonnes in Canadian service. Construction on the first ship began in November 2019, and a contract to build the second ship was officially awarded to Seaspan in June 2020. They were initially to be named for battles of the War of 1812, with HMCS Queenston as the lead ship, followed by HMCS Châteauguay, but the vessels were renamed Protecteur and Preserver respectively in September 2017.

 The , previously referred to as the Arctic Patrol Ship Project (AOPS), announced in 2007, is a program to build six Polar Class 5 Arctic patrol ships capable of operating in ice and to establish the Nanisivik Naval Facility, a deep water port in Arctic Bay, Baffin Island, Nunavut that would support RCN operations in the Northwest Passage and adjacent waters. The lead ship began construction at the Irving Shipyard in Halifax in September 2015. The projected service entry for the lead ship of the class was to be in 2018 (though that date later slipped by three years). In September 2014, Prime Minister Stephen Harper announced that the name of the first ship in the class would be , named in honour of wartime Canadian naval hero Harry DeWolf and that the class would be named the Harry DeWolf class. The RCN accepted Harry DeWolf in July 2020, and formally commissioned her in June 2021, following post-acceptance sea trials.
 The Halifax-class frigates underwent a mid-life extension program that began in 2010 and was completed in November 2016, and it was revealed in the October 2011 announcement of the National Shipbuilding Procurement Strategy that the RCN would be procuring up to 15 vessels under the Canadian Surface Combatant project to replace both the 12 Halifax-class frigates and the (now decommissioned) 4 Iroquois-class destroyers. In October 2018, a consortium led by BAE Systems and Lockheed Martin Canada was selected as the preferred design for the Canadian Surface Combatant project, with a variant of BAE's Type 26 frigate (by that stage already ordered by both the Royal Navy and Royal Australian Navy) chosen as the platform. This class of ship is currently in the design phase with construction anticipated to begin in around 2024.
 The Maritime Helicopter Project is an RCAF procurement project that is replacing the CH-124 Sea Kings with 28 CH-148 Cyclone shipborne anti-submarine warfare helicopters to operate from RCN warships. This project has been delayed by several years for a variety of developmental challenges. However, deliveries of the Block 1 airframe began in June 2015 and, as of February 2019, seventeen had been delivered. The initial operating capability for the Cyclone was declared in mid-2018. As of May 2021, 23 helicopters had been delivered of which at least 19 were reportedly the Block-2 variant.
 In May 2019, it was announced that Saab Skeldar V-200 UAVs would be acquired for the RCN and Canadian special forces. The light UAVs would be capable of operating from both the Halifax-class frigates and Harry DeWolf-class patrol ships.
 In December 2022, Kraken Robotics Inc. was awarded a prime contract by the Government of Canada to provide Remote Minehunting and Disposal Systems (RMDS) for the Department of National Defense. The acquisition portion of the contract is likely to be signed in January 2023 and run over 24 months. Two classes of autonomous underwater vehicles (AUVs) will be delivered to the RCN: Lightweight AUVs and operator portable AUVs, both equipped with AquaPix synthetic aperture sonar. The RMDS also includes a number of combat-variant and training-variant mine disposal systems (MDS), a transportable command center (TCC) and a computer-based trainer (CBT). The capability is intended to be modular, portable, and operable from various platforms or from shore locations.

Personnel

Commissioned officers

Commissioned officers of the Canadian Armed Forces have ranks ranging from the NATO standard ranks of OF-1 to OF-9. The only OF-9 position in the Canadian Forces is the Chief of the Defence Staff, who can be from any of the service elements. The highest position occupied in the current RCN structure is OF-8, a vice-admiral who serves as the Commander of the Royal Canadian Navy and Chief of the Naval Staff. OF-6 (commodore) to OF-9 (admiral) are referred to as flag officers, OF-3 (lieutenant-commander) to OF-5 (captain (N)) are referred to as senior officers, while OF-2 (lieutenant (N)) and OF-1 (sub-lieutenant) are referred to as junior officers. Naval cadets are referred to as subordinate officers. All except subordinate officers of the Canadian Forces receive a commission from the King of Canada as Commander-in-Chief of the Canadian Armed Forces. The commissioning scroll issued in recognition of the commission is signed by the Governor General of Canada as the King of Canada's representative and countersigned by the serving Minister of National Defence. Subordinate officers are promoted to acting sub-lieutenant upon receiving their commissions.

Naval officers are trained at the Royal Military College of Canada in Kingston, Ontario, the Royal Military College Saint-Jean in Saint-Jean, Quebec, Naval Officer Training Centre (NOTC) Venture and Naval Fleet School (Pacific) in Esquimalt, British Columbia, and Naval Fleet School (Atlantic) in Halifax, Nova Scotia. Some specialized candidates may be commissioned without attending the Royal Military College; the plan is known as Direct-Entry Officer (DEO) Plan. Senior NCOs may also be offered commissions on the basis that their training and experience give them a comparable basis of knowledge; this is referred to as the Commission-from-the-Ranks (CFR) Plan. NCOs who are offered such promotions are typically petty officer 1st class or higher, with 20 or more years of service.

The RCN rank structure is shown below.
 
Commander-in-Chief
 

Officers

Non-commissioned members
Non-commissioned members of the RCN have pay grades ranging from OR-1 to OR-9. OR-9 (chief petty officer 1st class), OR-8 (chief petty officers 2nd class) and OR-7 (petty officer 1st class) are known as petty officers, and OR-6 (petty officer 2nd class, referred to as senior non-commissioned officer) form the senior cadre of the non-commissioned members of the military. OR-5 (master sailor) and OR-4 (sailor first class) are referred to as junior non-commissioned officers, while OR-3 (sailor second class) and OR-2 (sailor third class) are referred to as junior ranks.

All Regular Force non-commissioned members of the Canadian Forces undergo basic training at the Canadian Forces Leadership and Recruit School in Saint-Jean-sur-Richelieu. Recruits then attend occupation-specific training at various locations across Canada.

In August 2020, the term "seaman" was replaced with the gender-neutral term "sailor".

Traditions

Colours

The RCN was granted the right to use the King's Colour in 1925 by King George V. The Queen's or King's Colour (also referred to as the sovereign's colour) for the Navy has been consecrated and presented four times: in 1939 by King George VI in Esquimalt, in 1959 by Queen Elizabeth II in Halifax, in 1979 by Queen Elizabeth the Queen Mother in Halifax and in 2009 by the Governor General and Commander-in-Chief Michaëlle Jean in Halifax. The colour used by the RCN between 1927 and 1936 was never actually presented but went straight into service in both the Atlantic and Pacific commands. Two identical colours were presented, one for the Atlantic fleet and one for the Pacific fleet, in 1926, 1939 and 1959, but only one colour was presented in 1979 and 2009. This colour is maintained in RCN Headquarters in Ottawa and dispatched to ceremonies whenever it is needed. The current colours consist of a ceremonial standard with the Maple Leaf flag in the top left canton, Elizabeth II's personal Commonwealth cypher (a capital E on a blue background, surrounded by a circlet of gold roses and laurels, surmounted by a crown) and an anchor and naval crown (from the Canadian Naval Ensign) on the lower right fly. These elements are found in the 1979 and 2009 colours. The colours from 1926, 1939 and 1959 consist of a White Ensign with the Queen's or King's cypher, surrounded by the Garter and ensigned with the Crown, in the middle. With the Queen's death there will be eventually a new King's Colour incorporating his cypher. Until then, the Queen's Colour continues to be the Royal Colour of the RCN.

The RCN's retired colours are laid up at Beechwood Cemetery in Ottawa.

Badge

The first badge of the Royal Canadian Navy was approved on 31 March 1944. The original design included nine maple leaves, representing the then nine provinces of Canada, and a Tudor Crown. After Newfoundland joined Canada in 1949, an updated design was approved on 17 July 1952, which had ten maple leaves. On 26 March 1956, St. Edward's Crown replaced the Tudor Crown. This badge remained in use until the unification of the Canadian Armed Forces on 1 February 1968.

When the Royal Canadian Navy became the Canadian Forces Maritime Command in 1968, the branch received a new badge. This badge included a flying eagle along with the anchor, representing the air arm of the navy. It also included a motto, 'Ready Aye Ready'. Following the reinstatement of the Royal Canadian Navy name in 2011, a new badge was approved in 2016.

The current badge of the Royal Canadian Navy consists of:
 St. Edward's Crown
 A fouled anchor, within a circlet
 A compartment of maple leaves
 Motto:  (Latin for 'Ready aye ready')

Heritage
The history of RCN is preserved and presented at the Maritime Command Museum in Halifax, the Canadian War Museum, the Naval Museum of Alberta, the Naval Museum of Manitoba, the naval museums at Naval Reserve Headquarters in Quebec City and at CFB Esquimalt as well as the Maritime Museum of British Columbia. The corvette HMCS Sackville serves as Canada's Naval Memorial. The Royal Canadian Navy Monument is located on the banks of the Ottawa River in Ottawa. A monument at Point Pleasant Park in Halifax commemorates members of RCN who have died in peacetime and there are valour memorials in Halifax, Quebec City and Esquimalt.

Memorials

 "Royal Canadian Naval Association Naval Memorial (1995)" by André Gauthier (sculptor) was erected on the shore of Lake Ontario in Spencer Smith Park in Burlington, Ontario. The model for the statue was a local Sea Cadet wearing Mike Vencel's naval service uniform. Engraved on the black granite base are the names of RCN and Canadian Merchant Navy ships sunk during the Second World War.
 A commemorative plaque in SS Point Pleasant Park, Halifax, Nova Scotia unveiled in 1967, "When the United Kingdom declared war on Germany in 1914, Canada and Newfoundland's participation was virtually unquestioned. With the onset of the Second World War in 1939 Canadians and Newfoundlanders once more rushed to enlist and were a major factor in the Allied victories in both conflicts. During two world wars, the main duty of the RCN was to escort convoys in the Atlantic and guard merchant vessels against the threat of attack by German submarines. In the Second World War, it also escorted ships in the Mediterranean and to Russia and supported the Allied landings in Sicilian, Italian and Normandy campaigns as well as in the Pacific. The Canadian Merchant Navy's duties included the transportation of troops and supplies to the Allied armies and food for the United Kingdom, extremely dangerous work which resulted in considerable losses."
 At the Maritime Museum of the Atlantic in Halifax, Nova Scotia. "In memory of 2200 known Canadian Merchant Seamen and 91 Canadian vessels lost by enemy action and those who served in the cause of freedom – World War I 1914–1918; World War II 1939–1945; Korean Conflict 1950–1953"

See also

 Canadian Coast Guard
 Hull classification symbol (Canada)
 The North Atlantic Squadron (song)
List of ships of the Royal Canadian Navy
List of current ships of the Royal Canadian Navy

Notes
 The Department of National Defence and the Canadian Forces

References

Further reading

 Armstrong, John Griffith. The Halifax Explosion and the Royal Canadian Navy: Inquiry and Intrigue (Vol. 1. UBC Press, 2002)
 Auchterlonie, Lieutenant Commander JR Bob. "Meeting the Challenge: The Canadian Navy in the New Strategic Environment." (Toronto: Canadian Forces College Command and Staff Course Masters Thesis Paper, 2004). online
 Douglas, W. A. B. and Michael Whitby. A Blue Water Navy: The Official Operational History of the Royal Canadian Navy in the Second World War, 1943–1945.
 German, Tony. The sea is at our gates: the history of the Canadian navy (McClelland & Stewart, 1990)
 Gimblett, Richard H., and Michael L. Hadley, eds. Citizen Sailors: Chronicles of Canada's Naval Reserve, 1910–2010 (Dundurn, 2010)
 
 Huebert, Rob. "Submarines, Oil Tankers, and Icebreakers: Trying to Understand Canadian Arctic Sovereignty and Security." International Journal 66 (2010): 809.
 
 Milner, Marc. North Atlantic run: the Royal Canadian Navy and the battle for the convoys (University of Toronto Press, 1985)
 Morton, Desmond. A military history of Canada (Random House LLC, 2007)
 Parker, Mike. Running the Gauntlet: An Oral History of Canadian Merchant Seamen in World War II (Nimbus, 1994)
 Pritchard, James. A Bridge of Ships: Canadian Shipbuilding During the Second World War (McGill-Queen's Press-MQUP, 2011)
 Rawling, William. "The Challenge of Modernization: The Royal Canadian Navy and Antisubmarine Weapons, 1944–1945." Journal of Military History 63 (1999): 355–378.  in JSTOR
 Schull, Joseph. Lointoins navires: compte rendu official des operations de la Marine canadienne au cours de la seconde Grande Guerre. Ottawa, Ont.: E. Cloutier, 1953. N.B.: "Publié d'ordre du ministre de la Défense nationale."
 Tracy, Nicholas. Two-Edged Sword: The Navy as an Instrument of Canadian Foreign Policy (McGill-Queen's Press-MQUP, 2012)

External links 

 
 RCN photographs taken by sailors in action.

 
Federal departments and agencies of Canada
1910 establishments in Canada
Canadian Forces Maritime Command
Military units and formations of Canada in World War II
Military units and formations established in 1910